Monte Mor is a municipality (município) in the state of São Paulo in Brazil. It is part of the Metropolitan Region of Campinas. The population is 60,754 (2020 est.) in an area of 240.57 km². The elevation is 560 m.

References

Municipalities in São Paulo (state)